Hanna Fenichel Pitkin (born July 17, 1931) is an American political theorist. 
She is best known for her seminal study The Concept of Representation, published in 1967.

Pitkin's diverse interests range from the history of European political thought from ancient to modern times, through ordinary language philosophy and textual analysis, to issues of psychoanalysis and gender in political and social theory.

Biography 
Pitkin is a professor emerita of political science at the University of California, Berkeley. Daughter of Otto Fenichel, Pitkin was born in Berlin and emigrated to the United States in 1938; her family had fled Nazi Germany for Oslo and Prague in the interim. She received her Doctor of Philosophy degree from UC Berkeley in 1961. In 1982, she was granted the Distinguished Teaching Award from UC Berkeley.

Political representation 
In The Concept of Representation Pitkin describes four types of representation:  formalistic, descriptive, symbolic and substantive.

Books 
Pitkin's books are The Concept of Representation (1967), Wittgenstein and Justice (1972, 1984, 1992), and Fortune Is a Woman: Gender and Politics in the Thought of Niccolò Machiavelli (1984, 1999), in addition to numerous articles and edited volumes. In 1998 she published The Attack of the Blob: Hannah Arendt's Concept of "the Social". A wide selection of her writings are collected and thematized in Hanna Fenichel Pitkin: Politics, Justice, Action (2016).

Awards and legacy 
In 2003, she was awarded the Johan Skytte Prize in Political Science "for her groundbreaking theoretical work, predominantly on the problem of representation". She was married to political theorist John Schaar.
Some of her students are noteworthy political scientists such as David Laitin (Stanford University), Dan Avnon (Hebrew University,
Jerusalem), Lisa Wedeen (University of Chicago), and Mary G. Dietz (Northwestern University).

See also 
 Representation (politics)

References

External links 
 A Conversation with Hanna Pitkin

1931 births
20th-century American non-fiction writers
20th-century American women writers
American political philosophers
American women political scientists
American political scientists
Jewish emigrants from Nazi Germany to the United States
Jewish American academics
Jewish women writers
Living people
University of California, Berkeley alumni
University of California, Berkeley faculty
Writers from Berlin
Writers from Los Angeles
21st-century American Jews
21st-century American women